

Events
Upon his January 1921 election as Governor of Illinois, Lennington Small would begin issuing over 1,000 pardons to Chicago criminals during his seven years in office, until his own indictment for fraud.
Sangerman's Bombers rise to prominence soon after the 1921 arrest and imprisonment of James Sweeney, leader of Sweeney's Bombers, a Chicago gang leader and professional bomber.
Former Black Hand bomber Andrew Kerr is arrested and charged with conspiracy to bomb several union offices.
Chicago Black Hand leader, Sam Cardinelli, and fellow mobsters Nicholas "The Choir Boy" Viana and Frank Campione executed for the murder of saloon owner Andrew P. Bowman.
A major gang war breaks out in California between the Suey Sing, Bing Kong, Jung Ying and Suey Don tongs.
Carlo Gambino, the future founder of the Gambino crime family, arrives in New York as a stowaway from Palermo, Sicily at the age of 19.
May 12 – Chicago mobster and president of the Unione Siciliane, Anthony D'Andrea, is gunned down only hours following a card game the previous night. He is succeeded by Mike Merlo.
May 20 – Labor racketeer Cornelius Shea is accused of leading a bombing campaign during a stationary engineer's strike, in 1920. Charges are never filed due to lack of evidence.
July – Steve Wisniewski, a Chicago gunman who had recently hijacked a North Side Gang beer shipment, is last seen with Hymie Weiss and presumably taken outside Chicago and killed. Upon Weiss's return he explained "I took Stevie for a one way ride." This is the first time a gangland killing is used as the phrase "one way ride" is still commonly used today to refer to this method.
August 14 – Joseph Sinacola is gunned down in front of his two children during the long running feud between Jim Powers and Phillip D'Andrea. Sinacola had been released from hospital just two weeks earlier, following a July 6 attempt on his life.

Arts and literature
 Season 2 of HBO's Boardwalk Empire

Births
January 19 – William Devino, high-ranking member of the Gambino crime family
February 24 – Peter Marcello, Sr., younger brother of Carlos Marcello, boss of the New Orleans crime family
July 28 – Frank "Frankie Bal" Balistrieri, Milwaukee Mafia leader

Deaths
May 12 – Anthony D'Andrea, Chicago mobster and Unione Siciliane President
July – Steve Wisniewski, Chicago gunman
July 15 – Sam Cardinelli, (Chicago) Black Hand leader

References 

Organized crime
Years in organized crime